Australia competed at the 1924 Summer Olympics in Paris, France.  Australian athletes have competed in every Summer Olympic Games.

Medalists

Aquatics

Diving

A single diver represented Australia in 1924. It was the nation's second appearance in the sport. Eve won the gold medal in the plain high diving competition, Australia's first Olympic diving medal. He also finished fifth in the springboard event.

Ranks given are within the heat.

Swimming

Ranks given are within the heat.

* – Indicates athlete swam in the preliminaries but not in the final race.

Athletics

Nine athletes represented Australia in 1924. It was the nation's fifth appearance in the sport (excluding appearances as part of Australasia). Winter took the nation's only athletics medal of the Games, a gold in the triple jump.

Ranks given are within the heat.

Boxing 

Three boxers represented Australia at the 1924 Games. It was the nation's debut in the sport, though an Australian had won a silver medal as part of the 1908 Australasia team. Sinclair was the only Australian to win a match in 1924; none of the Australian boxers advanced past the round of 16.

Cycling

Four cyclists represented Australia in 1924. It was the nation's second appearance in the sport.

Road cycling

Ranks given are within the heat.

Track cycling

Ranks given are within the heat.

Rowing

Ten rowers represented Australia in 1924. It was the nation's debut in the sport, though the 1912 Australasia team included rowers.

Ranks given are within the heat.

Tennis

 Men

Wrestling

Freestyle wrestling

 Men's

References 
Andrews, Malcolm, Australia at the Olympics, ABC Books, 2000
Official Olympic Reports
International Olympic Committee results database
sports-reference

Nations at the 1924 Summer Olympics
1924
Olympics